Gabriele Altweck (born 11 January 1963) is a German former cyclist. She competed in the women's road race event at the 1984 Summer Olympics.

References

External links
 

1963 births
Living people
German female cyclists
Olympic cyclists of West Germany
Cyclists at the 1984 Summer Olympics
Cyclists from Munich